Sébastien Mazeyrat (born October 10, 1978 in Riom, Puy-de-Dôme) is a French professional football player. He played in the Ligue 2 for Clermont Foot.

See also
Football in France
List of football clubs in France

References

1978 births
Living people
People from Riom
French footballers
Ligue 2 players
Clermont Foot players
US Saint-Georges players
Association football defenders
Sportspeople from Puy-de-Dôme
Footballers from Auvergne-Rhône-Alpes